Marek Sikora (30 August 1959 in Busko-Zdrój – 22 April 1996 in Służów) was a Polish film actor and theatre director.

References

1959 births
1996 deaths
Polish male actors